The following is a list of notable people who have served on the staff of The Harvard Crimson, the student newspaper at Harvard University.

Academia
Rediet Abebe, computer scientist
Stephen Barnett (1935–2009), legal scholar at University of California, Berkeley School of Law who opposed the Newspaper Preservation Act of 1970
Nancy Bauer, professor of philosophy at Tufts University and dean of the School of the Museum of Fine Arts at Tufts
Geoffrey Cowan, professor at USC Annenberg School for Communication and Journalism
Jamal Greene, professor at Columbia Law School
Peter Kramer, psychiatrist, author
Thomas Samuel Kuhn, philosopher and historian of science
Charles S. Maier, professor of history at Harvard University
John U. Monro, dean of Harvard College (1958–1967)
Eric M. Nelson, professor of government at Harvard

Authors, journalists, and writers
Ravi Agrawal, reporter for CNN
Jonathan Alter, author covering U.S. Presidents
Joseph Alsop, political reporter
Cleveland Amory, writer
Eli Attie, speechwriter and screenwriter
Michael Barone, television commentator, writer for The Washington Examiner, author
Daniel J. Boorstin, American author and writer and Librarian of Congress
Irin Carmon, reporter for MSNBC
Sewell Chan, journalist for The Los Angeles Times
Steve Chapman, columnist, Chicago Tribune
Susan Chira, author, foreign editor of The New York Times
Nicholas Ciarelli, founder and editor of Think Secret and founder of BookBub
Adam Clymer, author, journalist for The New York Times
Jonathan Cohn, author, journalist for The New Republic
Richard Connell, author
Jim Cramer, host of CNBC's Mad Money. Cramer is a former Crimson president. 
Michael Crichton, author
E. J. Dionne, columnist for The Washington Post
Ross Douthat, columnist for The New York Times
Ethan Drogin, writer for Suits and Lie to Me
Esther Dyson, digital technology analyst, author
Daniel Ellsberg, author, released the Pentagon Papers
David Fahrenthold, political reporter for The Washington Post
James Fallows, journalist
Susan Faludi, author
Nicholas Fandos, political reporter for The New York Times
David Frankel, filmmaker
Jennifer Frey, sports reporter for The New York Times and The Washington Post
Otto Fuerbringer, former editor of Time
V.V. Ganeshananthan, author and journalist
Susan Glasser, journalist at The New Yorker
George Goodman, a.k.a. "Adam Smith," hosted the Emmy award-winning program Adam Smith's Money World on PBS
Garrett Graff, reporter
Donald E. Graham, CEO and chairman of The Washington Post Co. Graham is a former Crimson president. 
Linda Greenhouse, journalist for The New York Times
David Halberstam, author
Hendrik Hertzberg, journalist for The New Yorker
David Ignatius, columnist for The Washington Post
Boisfeuillet Jones Jr., publisher and CEO of The Washington Post
Joseph Kahn, Executive Editor of The New York Times. Kahn is a former Crimson president. 
Peter Kaplan, former editor-in-chief of The New York Observer, current creative director of Condé Nast Traveler
Mickey Kaus, journalist and political blogger
Mary Louise Kelly, co-host of NPR's All Things Considered
Michael Kinsley, journalist, founding editor of Slate magazine
Nicholas D. Kristof, columnist for The New York Times
Charles Lane, former editor of The New Republic
Jennifer 8. Lee, former journalist for The New York Times
Nicholas Lemann, dean of the Columbia University Graduate School of Journalism
Jessica Lessin, founder of The Information
Anthony Lewis, author and former columnist for The New York Times
Walter Lippmann, Pulitzer Prize winner and recipient of the Presidential Medal of Freedom
Arthur Lubow, journalist
J. Anthony Lukas, author and Pulitzer Prize–winning journalist
Michael Maccoby, New York Times best-selling author and psychoanalyst
Dylan Matthews, writer for Vox
Seth Mnookin, author of Hard News
Noah Oppenheim, president of NBC News
Alexandra Petri, comedy writer for The Washington Post
David Plotz, former CEO of Atlas Obscura and host of Slate Political Gabfest
Frank Rich, columnist for The New York Times
Steven V. Roberts, former reporter for The New York Times, television journalist
Scott Rosenberg, co-founder of Salon.com
Yair Rosenberg, writer for Tablet Magazine
Jack Rosenthal, journalist for The New York Times and president of The New York Times Company Foundation
David Sanger, journalist for The New York Times
Charlie Savage, Pulitzer Prize–winning journalist for The New York Times
Nell Scovell, creator of Sabrina the Teenage Witch and co-author of Lean In
Robert Ellis Smith, noted journalist and creator of the Privacy Journal
Whit Stillman, filmmaker
Ira Stoll, New York Sun executive
Stephen Stromberg, Washington Post editorial board
Katrina Szish, television personality
Evan Thomas, associate managing editor of Newsweek
Jeffrey Toobin, senior legal analyst for CNN
Pablo S. Torre, ESPN writer and television personality 
Craig Unger, author and journalist
George Weller, novelist, playwright, Pulitzer Prize–winning journalist for The New York Times and The Chicago Daily News
Mark Whitaker, senior vice president of NBC News, former editor of Newsweek
Theodore H. White, prominent political and WWII journalist
Amy Wilentz, journalist and contributing editor at The Nation
Elizabeth Wurtzel, author
Jeff Zucker, president of CNN and former president and CEO of NBC Universal. Zucker is a former Crimson president.

Business
Steve Ballmer, former CEO of Microsoft and owner of the Los Angeles Clippers
Hayley Barna, co-founder of Birchbox
Nathan Blecharczyk, co-founder of Airbnb
Charlie Cheever, co-founder of Quora
Parker Conrad, founder of Zenefits
Robert Decherd, CEO of A. H. Belo Corporation
Jennifer Hyman, co-founder of Rent The Runway
Andy Jassy, CEO of Amazon (company)
Thomas W. Lamont, former Chairman of J.P. Morgan & Co.
James S. Marcus, investment banker and philanthropist
David Rockefeller, chairman of Chase Manhattan Bank and member of the Rockefeller family
Frederick M. Warburg, partner of Kuhn, Loeb & Co.
Byron Wien, prominent investor with Morgan Stanley and Blackstone
Susan Wojcicki, CEO of YouTube

Government and politics
Tony Blinken, Secretary of State during the Biden Administration
Richard Blumenthal, Senator from Connecticut
Pete Buttigieg, former Mayor of South Bend, Indiana and 2020 Presidential candidate
Blair Clark, manager of Eugene McCarthy's 1968 presidential campaign. Clark is a former Crimson president.
James Bryant Conant, President of Harvard University from 1933-1953
Tom Cotton, Senator from Arkansas
Brian Fallon, press secretary for Hillary Clinton during her 2016 presidential campaign
Frederick Vanderbilt Field, socialist activist
James Glassman, journalist, diplomat, and director of the George W. Bush Institute
C. Boyden Gray, Committee for Justice chairman and White House Counsel to President George H. W. Bush
Caroline Kennedy, U.S. ambassador to Australia and daughter of U.S. President John F. Kennedy
John F. Kennedy, 35th President of the United States
Grover Norquist, president of Americans for Tax Reform
Chris Pappas, Representative from New Hampshire
Mark Penn, chief political strategist for Hillary Clinton's 2008 presidential campaign
Gina Raimondo, Governor of Rhode Island
Franklin D. Roosevelt, 32nd President of the United States. Roosevelt is a former Crimson president. 
Elise Stefanik, Representative from New York
Paul Sweezy, Marxist economist and funder of the Monthly Review
Caspar Weinberger, United States Secretary of Defense under President Ronald Reagan

Law
David J. Barron, circuit judge on the United States Court of Appeals for the First Circuit
David Bruck, capital defense attorney
Paul A. Engelmayer, circuit judge on the United States District Court for the Southern District of New York
Garrett Epps, author and law school professor
Merrick Garland, United States Attorney General, former Circuit Judge and former Supreme Court nominee
Melissa Hart, justice on the Colorado Supreme Court
Leondra Kruger, Associate Justice of the Supreme Court of California

Other
Mark Gearan, former Peace Corps director
Colin Jost, comedian and writer for Saturday Night Live
Jon Ledecky, owner of the New York Islanders
Bill McKibben, environmentalist, author
David Stearns, general manager of the Milwaukee Brewers
Andrew Weil, alternative medicine advocate

Harvard Crimson leadership (1994 to present)

References

Crimson
Crimson people
Lists of people by university or college in Massachusetts